Lysine-specific demethylase 4B is an enzyme that in humans is encoded by the KDM4B gene. KDM4B belongs to the alpha-ketoglutarate-dependent hydroxylase superfamily.

References

Further reading

Human 2OG oxygenases
EC 1.14.11